Christine Edzard (born 15 February 1945) is a film director, writer, and costume designer, nominated for BAFTA and Oscar awards for her screenwriting. She has been based in London for most of her career.

Early life
Edzard was born and raised in Paris by her German-born father, Dietz Edzard, and Polish mother, Suzanne Eisendieck, both painters. After a degree in economics she trained as a set and costume designer with Lila De Nobili and Rotislav Duboujinsky. She assisted Di Nobili on Franco Zeffirelli's productions of Aida and Romeo and Juliet at La Scala in 1963 and 1968.

Career
Edzard co-wrote and designed the film Tales of Beatrix Potter (1971), for which she was nominated for two BAFTA awards for Best Costume Design and Best Art Direction.

With her husband, the film producer Richard B. Goodwin, she founded the Sands Films studio and production company in Rotherhithe, London in 1975. The studios include the Rotherhithe Picture Research Library, a free resource for the general public, and the building was awarded a Blue Plaque in 2009, unveiled in January that year by Derek Jacobi. Over the years Sands Films has made and supplied period costumes for international film and TV productions.

Edzard is best known for her film adaptation of Charles Dickens's novel, Little Dorrit (1988), a British film for which she was nominated for an Oscar, a BAFTA Award, and a Los Angeles Film Critics Award.

Partial director and writer filmography 

 The Children's Midsummer Night's Dream (2001) (direction, design) 
 The IMAX Nutcracker Prince (1997) (screenplay, design, direction) 
Amahl and the Night Visitors - filmed opera by Gian Carlo Menotti (direction, set and costume design)
 As You Like It (1991 film) (direction, design) 
 The Fool (1990) (screenplay adapted from Henry Mayhew, design, direction)
 Biddy (1983)  (Screenplay, direction)
 Little Dorrit (1987) (screenplay, direction, design) 
 The Nightingale (1981) (screenplay, direction)
Stories from a Flying Trunk (1979) (three short films, Little Ida (1975),  The Kitchen (1975) and The Little Match Girl (1975))
 Tales of Beatrix Potter (1972)

Making and supplying of period costumes
Wolf Hall
The Young Victoria
Mr Turner
Amistad
Oscar and Lucinda
Les Miserables
A Little Chaos
The Woman in White
Jonathan Strange & Mr Norrell
Great Expectations (BAFTA award for Best Costumes)
Gormenghast
Topsy-Turvy (Academy Award for Best Costumes)

References

External links

Sands Films official website
Guardian article
Financial Times article
Greenwich Society history of Sands Films
The Costume Society
The Guardian South Side Story, on The Children's Midsummer Night's Dream, Dec 8, 2000
Warwick University Shakespeare Project
Rotislav Doboujinsky in the V&A Collections
Lila De Nobili in the V&A Collections

1945 births
Living people
British women film directors
British women screenwriters
Film people from Paris
British costume designers
British film producers
British film directors